Sir Charles Lyell (1797–1875) was a geologist and populariser of uniformitarianism.

Charles Lyell may also refer to:

Charles Henry Lyell (1875–1918), Liberal MP
Charles Lyell, 2nd Baron Lyell (1913–1943), Victoria Cross recipient, son of the Liberal MP
Charles Lyell, 3rd Baron Lyell (1939–2017), Conservative member of the House of Lords, son of the 2nd Baron
Charles Lyell (botanist) (1767–1849), English botanist and translator of Dante

See also
Charles Lyall (disambiguation)
Charles Lyle (disambiguation)